The Taipoiti River is a short river of the Canterbury region of New Zealand's South Island. One of the headwaters of the Waimakariri River, it flows southeast from the Shaler Range to reach the White River.

See also
List of rivers of New Zealand

References

Rivers of Canterbury, New Zealand
Rivers of New Zealand